New Albany High School is a public high school located in New Albany, Ohio as part of the New Albany-Plain Local School District. New Albany is a four-year comprehensive high school accredited by the Ohio Department of Education. It has been nationally recognized as a School of Excellence. Due to population expansion, the school was expanded in 1996.

History
In the 1820s in Plain Township, schooling had been taught in log cabins. In 1821, a frame school building was built on Central College; the teacher was Jacob Smith. In 1874, a new brick school was built in the Village.

In 1955, the Ohio General Assembly eliminated the requirement that cities and school districts have common borders. From the 50s through the 70s, the City of Columbus aggressively annexed land, causing concern for local school districts. In 1980 the suburban school districts together persuaded the Ohio General Assembly to place a two-year moratorium on all big-city school district transfers. Concerned legislators asked school officials to work out a solution to the growing "turf war" over the changing school district boundaries. In 1982, when little progress was made toward arriving at an agreeable solution, the General Assembly extended the moratorium for another two years, but stated they would not renew it again in 1986. Once again, the districts were directed to develop permanent boundary and annexation agreements. State Representative Michael Stinziano (Columbus) and other community and education leaders convened a series of negotiations with the Franklin County school district officials in 1986. These officials eventually reached an agreement, called the “Joint Agreement Among and Between the Boards of Education of Certain School Districts in Franklin County, Ohio”, nicknamed “Win-Win”. The agreement established mechanisms to predict school district boundaries among the twelve member districts. It set procedures for Columbus to acquire new territory in the future, and established revenue sharing between Columbus City Schools and the suburban districts. The success of the agreement's adoption resulted in the Ohio General Assembly’s approval, and Governor Celeste’s signing of the agreement.

The current New Albany High School was built in 1996. The school was expanded in 2002 to include an additional academic wing with offices, a new high school football stadium and additional locker rooms. Those improvements were completed in 2004.

Facilities

The New Albany Plain Local School District operates the following facilities:

New Albany Early Learning Center (Formally New Albany K-1)
New Albany Primary School (Formerly New Albany 2-5)
New Albany Intermediate School (Formerly New Albany 1-8)
New Albany Middle School
New Albany High School
Jeanne B. McCoy Community Center for the Arts

Part of New Albany's building project in 1996 was the completion of a natatorium. This facility is open to the community, as well as the students. It also hosts home meets for the New Albany Swimming and Diving team.

The McCoy Company and New Albany-Plain Local School District both share the building.

In 2013, an artificial turf football field was built inside the old football stadium. The football stadium was renamed "Veterans Field" in honor of all the alumni who served in the armed forces. The football field was an addition that was completely funded by donations from the public.

In 2019, the city of New Albany opened "Rose Run Park", complete with a bridge connecting the campus to the New Albany library and Market Street stores, bike trails, and more.

In 2019, the New Albany Plain Local Schools district leased land to the City of New Albany, to begin construction on an amphitheater
between New Albany Middle School, and the Jeanne B. McCoy Center for the Arts.

Athletics

Teams
 Fall: Cheerleading, Cross Country, Football, Golf, Soccer, Tennis, Volleyball, Field Hockey
 Winter: Cheerleading, Basketball, Hockey, Swimming & Diving, Wrestling, Bowling
 Spring: Baseball, Lacrosse, Softball, Tennis, Track and Field

Ohio High School Athletic Association Team State Championships
 Boys Baseball – 2004, 2021
 Girls Golf - 2018, 2019, 2020, 2021
 Girls Swimming - 2021, 2022
 Girls Lacrosse - 2022

Notable alumni
Rifqa Bary - writer
Darron Lee - National Football League (NFL) player
Graham Rahal - IndyCar driver
Kole Sherwood - National Hockey League (NHL) player
Drew Windle - runner

References

External links

District Website

High schools in Franklin County, Ohio
Public high schools in Ohio